Alessandro Carlo Gaetano Varano (1667–1735) was a Roman Catholic prelate who served as Bishop of Macerata e Tolentino (1698–1735).

Biography
Alessandro Carlo Gaetano Varano was born in Ferrara, Italy and ordained a priest on 22 June 1692.
On 21 July 1698, he was appointed during the papacy of Pope Innocent XII as Bishop of Macerata e Tolentino.
On 17 August 1698, he was consecrated bishop by Sebastiano Antonio Tanara, Cardinal-Priest of Santi Quattro Coronati, with Francesco Pannocchieschi d'Elci, Archbishop of Pisa, and Prospero Bottini, Titular Archbishop of Myra, serving as co-consecrators. 
He served as Bishop of Macerata e Tolentino until his death on 20 October 1735 .

References

External links and additional sources
 (for Chronology of Bishops) 
 (for Chronology of Bishops) 

17th-century Italian Roman Catholic bishops
18th-century Italian Roman Catholic bishops
Bishops appointed by Pope Innocent XII
1667 births
1735 deaths